Henley Beach railway station was a railway station in the western Adelaide suburb of Henley Beach.

History 

The station opened in 1894 and served as the terminus of the Henley Beach railway line. Sometime prior to 1940 (perhaps as early as 31 October 1913), the terminus station on the line (Henley Beach station) was closed, with the "Jetty Road" station becoming the terminus and being renamed Henley Beach, resulting in 4 stations on the line. Facilities consisted of an island platform and shelter with a ticket office.

It was closed on 31 August 1957 because of dangerous conditions caused by vehicles on Military Road. After closing, the station has since been demolished.

See also
 List of closed Adelaide railway stations

References

Disused railway stations in South Australia
Demolished buildings and structures in South Australia
Railway stations closed in 1957
Railway stations in Australia opened in 1894
Demolished railway stations